The Israʾ and Miʿraj are the two parts of a Night Journey that, according to Islam, the Islamic prophet Muhammad (AD 570–632) took during a single night around the year AD 621 (1 BH – 0 BH). Within Islam, it signifies both a physical and spiritual journey. A brief sketch of the story is in the 17th chapter of the Quran, called al-Isra', while greater detail is found in the hadith; later collections of the reports, teachings, deeds and sayings of Muhammad. 

In the Israʾ part of the journey, Muhammad is said to have traveled on the back of Buraq to the Al-Aqsa Mosque (i.e. the Temple Mount), where he led other prophets in prayer. In the next part of the journey, the Miʿraj, he ascended into heaven, where he individually greeted the prophets and later spoke to God, who gave Muhammad instructions to take back to the Muslims regarding the details of prayer. The journey and ascent are marked as one of the most celebrated dates in the Islamic calendar.

Islamic sources
The events of Isra and Miʿraj are mentioned briefly in the Quran and then further expanded and interpreted within the supplements to the Quran, the literary corpus known as hadith, which contain the reported sayings of Muhammad. Two of the best hadith sources are by Anas ibn Malik and Ibn ʿAbbas. Both were young boys at the time of Muhammad's journey of Mi'raj.

The Quran

Within the Quran, chapter 17 , was named after the Isra', and the first verse contains a brief description. There is also some information in a later verse, and some scholars say a verse in  also holds information on the Isra and Miʿraj.

Various hadiths contain much greater detail. The  is the part of the journey of Muhammad from Mecca to the farthest place of worship, though the city is not explicitly mentioned. The journey began when Muhammad was in the Great Mosque in Mecca, and the Archangel Jibrīl (or Jibrāʾīl, Gabriel) came to him, and brought Buraq, the traditional heavenly mount of the prophets. Buraq carried Muhammad to the "farthest place of worship". Muhammad alighted, tethered Buraq and performed prayer, where on God's command he was tested by Gabriel. It was told by Anas ibn Malik that Muhammad said: "Jibra'il brought me a vessel of wine, a vessel of water and a vessel of milk, and I chose the milk. Muhammad was then taken to Sidrat al-Muntaha – a holy tree in the seventh heaven that Gabriel was not allowed to pass. According to Islamic tradition, God instructed Muhammad that Muslims must pray fifty times per day; however, Moses told Muhammad that it was very difficult for the people and urged Muhammad to ask for a reduction, until finally it was reduced to five times per day.

The Miraj Nabwi 
There are different accounts of what occurred during the Miʿraj, but most narratives have the same elements: Muhammad ascends into heaven with the angel Gabriel and meets a different prophet at each of the seven levels of heaven; first Adam, then John the Baptist and Jesus, then Joseph, then Idris, then Aaron, then Moses, and lastly Abraham. After Muhammad meets with Abraham, he continues on to meet God without Gabriel. God tells Muhammad that his people must pray 50 times a day, but as Muhammad descends back to Earth, he meets Moses who tells Muhammad to go back to God and ask for fewer prayers because 50 is too many. Muhammad goes between Moses and God nine times, until the prayers are reduced to the five daily prayers, which God will reward tenfold. To that again, Moses tells Muhammad to ask for even fewer but Muhammad feels ashamed and says that he is thankful for the five.

Al-Tabari is a classic and authentic source for Islamic research. His description of the Miʿraj is just as simplified as the description given above, which is where other narratives and hadiths of the Miʿraj stem from, as well as word of mouth. While this is the simplest description of the Miʿraj, others include more details about the prophets that Muhammad meets. In accounts written by Muslims, Bukhari, Ibn Ishaq, Ahmad b. Hanbal and others, physical descriptions of the prophets are given. Adam is described first as being Muhammad's father, which establishes a link between them as first and last prophets. Physical descriptions of Adam show him as tall and handsome with long hair. Idris, who is not mentioned as much as the other prophets Muhammad meets, is described as someone who was raised to a higher status by God. Joseph is described as the most beautiful man who is like the moon. His presence in the Miʿraj is to show his popularity and how it relates to Muhammad's. Aaron is described as Muhammad's brother who is older and one of the most beautiful men that Muhammad had met. Again, the love for Aaron by his people relates to Muhammad and his people. Abraham is described with likeness to Muhammad in ways that illustrate him to be Muhammad's father. Jesus is usually linked to John the Baptist, who is not mentioned much. Moses is different than the other prophets that Muhammad meets in that Moses stands as a point of difference rather than similarities.

Some narratives also record events that preceded the heavenly ascent. Some scholars believe that the opening of Muhammad's chest was a cleansing ritual that purified Muhammad before he ascended into heaven. Muhammad's chest was opened up and water of Zamzam was poured on his heart giving him wisdom, belief, and other necessary characteristics to help him in his ascent. This purification is also seen in the trial of the drinks. It is debated when it took place—before or after the ascent—but either way it plays an important role in determining Muhammad's spiritual righteousness.

Ibn ʿAbbas Primitive Version
Ibn ʿAbbas' Primitive Version narrates all that Muhammad encounters throughout his journey through heaven. This includes seeing other angels, and seas of light, darkness, and fire. With Gabriel as his companion, Muhammad meets four key angels as he travels through the heavens. These angels are the Rooster angel (whose call influences all earthly roosters), Half-Fire Half-Snow angel (who provides an example of God's power to bring fire and ice in harmony), the Angel of Death (who describes the process of death and the sorting of souls), and the Guardian of Hellfire (who shows Muhammad what hell looks like). These four angels are met in the beginning of Ibn ʿAbbas' narrative. They are mentioned in other accounts of Muhammad's ascension, but they are not talked about with as much detail as Ibn ʿAbbas provides. As the narrative continues, Ibn ʿAbbas focuses mostly on the angels that Muhammad meets rather than the prophets. There are rows of angels that Muhammad encounters throughout heaven, and he even meets certain deeply devoted angels called cherubim. These angels instill fear in Muhammad, but he later sees them as God's creation, and therefore not harmful. Other important details that Ibn ʿAbbas adds to the narrative are the Heavenly Host Debate, the Final Verses of the Cow Chapter, and the Favor of the Prophets. These important topics help to outline the greater detail that Ibn ʿAbbas uses in his Primitive Version.

In an attempt to reestablish Ibn ʿAbbas as authentic, it seems as though a translator added the descent of Muhammad and the meeting with the prophets. The narrative only briefly states the encounters with the prophets, and does so in a way that is in chronological order rather than the normal order usually seen in ascension narratives. Ibn ʿAbbas may have left out the meeting of the prophets and the encounter with Moses that led to the reduction of daily prayers because those events were already written elsewhere. Whether he included that in his original narrative or if it was added by a later translator is unknown, but often a point of contention when discussing Ibn ʿAbbas's Primitive Version.

Sufi interpretations 
The belief that Muhammad made the heavenly journey bodily was used to prove the unique status of Muhammad. One theory among Sufis was that Muhammad's body could reach God to a proximity that even the greatest saints could only reach in spirit. They debated whether Muhammad had really seen the Lord and if he did, whether he did so with his eyes or with his heart. Nevertheless, Muhammad's superiority is again demonstrated in that even in the extreme proximity of the Lord, "his eye neither swerved nor was turned away," whereas Moses had fainted when the Lord appeared to him in a burning bush. Various thinkers used this point to prove the superiority of Muhammad. (The source for Moses' having fainted is in surah al-A'raf:143. In the Biblical narrative (Exodus 3:4–4:17), the texts for verse 3:6 state simply that Moses "hid his face" (Masoretic Hebrew, Targum Aramaic, and Samaritan) or "averted his face"  (Septuagint Greek).)

The Subtleties of the Ascension by Abu ʿAbd al-Rahman al-Sulami includes repeated quotations from other mystics that also affirm the superiority of Muhammad. Many Sufis interpreted the Miʿraj to ask questions about the meaning of certain events within the Miʿraj, and drew conclusions based on their interpretations, especially to substantiate ideas of the superiority of Muhammad over other prophets.

Muhammad Iqbal, a self-proclaimed intellectual descendant of Rumi and the poet-scholar who personified poetic Sufism in South Asia, used the event of the Miʿraj to conceptualize an essential difference between a prophet and a Sufi. He recounts that Muhammad, during his Miʿraj journey, visited the heavens and then eventually returned to the temporal world. Iqbal then quotes another South Asian Muslim saint by the name of 'Abdul Quddus Gangohi who asserted that if he (Gangohi) had had that experience, he would never have returned to this world. Iqbal uses Gangohi's spiritual aspiration to argue that while a saint or a Sufi would not wish to renounce the spiritual experience for something this-worldly, a prophet is a prophet precisely because he returns with a force so powerful that he changes world history by imbuing it with a creative and fresh thrust.

European sources

In the 13th century AD, an account of the Isra' and Mi'raj was translated into several European languages—Latin, Spanish and French. Known as the Book of Muhammad's Ladder, this account purports to be the words of Muhammad himself as recorded by Ibn Abbas. It was translated by Abraham of Toledo and Bonaventure of Siena. It may have influenced Dante Alighieri's account of an ascent to heaven and descent to hell in the Divine Comedy.

Modern Muslim observance
The Lailat al-Miʿraj, also known as Shab-e-Mi'raj in Iran, Pakistan, India and Bangladesh, and Miraç Kandili in Turkish, is the Muslim holiday celebrating the Isra and Miʿraj. Another name for the holiday is Mehraj-ul-Alam (also spelled Meraj-ul-Alam). Some Muslims celebrate this event by offering optional prayers during this night, and in some Muslim countries, by illuminating cities with electric lights and candles. The celebrations around this day tend to focus on every Muslim who wants to celebrate it. Worshippers gather into mosques and perform prayer and supplication. Some people may pass their knowledge on to others by telling them the story on how Muhammad's heart was purified by the archangel Gabriel, who filled him with knowledge and faith in preparation to enter the seven levels of heaven. After salah, food and treats are served.

In Jerusalem on the Temple Mount, the structure of the Dome of the Rock, built several decades after Muhammad's death, marks the place from which Muhammad is believed to have ascended to heaven. The exact date of the Journey is not clear, but is celebrated as though it took place before the Hijrah and after Muhammad's visit to the people of Ta'if. The normative view amongst Sunni Muslims who ascribe a specific date to the event is that it took place on the 27th of Rajab, slightly over a year before Hijrah.  This would correspond to the 26th of February 621 in the Western calendar. In Twelver Iran, Rajab 27 is the day of Muhammad's first calling or Mab'as. The al-Aqsa Mosque and surrounding area is now the third-holiest place on earth for Muslims.

Many sects and offshoots belonging to Islamic mysticism interpret Muhammad's night ascent – the Isra and Miʿraj – to be an out-of-body experience through nonphysical environments, unlike the Sunni Muslims or mainstream Islam. The mystics claim Muhammad was transported to the farthest place of worship and then onward to the Seven Heavens, even though "the apostle's body remained where it was."

Historical issues

Jerusalem site
The general consensus of modern Muslim scholars is that the Isra and Mi’raj were specific to a literal building, called Masjid Al-Aqsa, the farthest mosque, and that Muhammad did indeed go to a physical location at which a masjid structure (building) was already built. Minority Muslim groups have also regarded the journey as an out-of-body experience. Watt and Welch suggest that "the word masjid, which is used in the surah above literally translates as a 'place of prostration/worship' and thus indicates any place of worship, not necessarily a building." 

One issue with a physical interpretation of this story is that no city for the location of this mosque is mentioned. Tradition sometimes associates it with Jerusalem and the Temple Mount, but there is no historical evidence for a building there during Muhammad's lifetime. The first and second temples were destroyed by the Babylonians and the Romans, respectively, the latter more than five centuries before Muhammad's life. After the initially successful Jewish revolt against Heraclius, the Jewish population resettled in Jerusalem for a short period of time from AD 614 to 630 and immediately started to restore the temple on the Temple Mount and build synagogues in Jerusalem. After the Jewish population was expelled a second time from Jerusalem and shortly before Heraclius retook the city (AD 630), a small synagogue was already in place on the Temple Mount. This synagogue was reportedly demolished after Heraclius retook Jerusalem. 

No further building on the Temple Mount is recorded until after the Muslim conquest, after Muhammad's death. A small prayer house was built by Umar, the second caliph of the Rashidun Caliphate. This was rebuilt and expanded by the caliph Abd al-Malik in AD 690 along with the Dome of the Rock. In the reign of the caliph Mu'awiyah I of the Umayyad Caliphate (founded in AD 661), a quadrangular mosque for a capacity of 3,000 worshipers is recorded somewhere on the Haram ash-Sharif.

A hadith reports Muhammad's account of the experience:

"Then Gabriel brought a horse (Burraq) to me, which resembled lightning in swiftness and lustre, was of clear white colour, medium in size, smaller than a mule and taller than a (donkey), quick in movement that it put its feet on the farthest limit of the sight. He made me ride it and carried me to Jerusalem. He tethered the Burraq to the ring of that Temple to which all the Prophets in Jerusalem used to tether their beasts..."

Similarities to other Abrahamic traditions 
Traditions of living persons ascending to heaven are also found in early Jewish and Christian literature. In the Book of Kings of the Hebrew Bible/Old Testament, the prophet Elijah is said to have entered heaven alive "by fire". The Book of Enoch, a late Second Temple Jewish apocryphal work, describes a tour of heaven given by an angel to the patriarch Enoch, the great-grandfather of Noah. According to Brooke Vuckovic, early Muslims may have had precisely this ascent in mind when interpreting Muhammad's night journey. In the Testament of Abraham, from the first century CE, Abraham is shown the final judgement of the righteous and unrighteous in heaven.

See also
 Islamic view of miracles
 Entering heaven alive - view of the belief in various religions
 Transfiguration of Jesus
 Lake Zamkaft
 Miraj Nameh

References

Further reading

Colby, Frederick, "Night Journey (Isra & Mi'raj), in Muhammad in History, Thought, and Culture: An Encyclopedia of the Prophet of God (2 vols.), Edited by C. Fitzpatrick and A. Walker, Santa Barbara, ABC-CLIO, 2014, Vol II, pp. 420–425.
Schimmel, Annemarie, "The Prophet's Night Journey and Ascension", in And Muhammad Is His Messenger: The Veneration of the Prophet in Islamic Piety, University of North Carolina Press, Chapel Hill, 1985.

External links

 Author Unknown, "Commemorating The Prophet's Rapture And Ascension To His Lord " in Sunnah.org  (last accessed 24 September 2017)
 "Isra and Miraj: The Miraculous Night Journey in Daiyah  (last accessed 24 September 2017)
 Israa and Miraj in Learn Deen (last accessed 24 September 2017)
 A. Bevan, Muhammad's Ascension to Heaven, in "Studien zu Semitischen Philologie und Religionsgeschichte Julius Wellhausen," (Topelman, 1914, pp. 53–54.)
 B. Schrieke, "Die Himmelsreise Muhammeds," Der Islam 6 (1915–16): 1–30
 Colby, Frederick. The Subtleties of the Ascension: Lata'if Al-Miraj: Early Mystical Sayings on Muhammad's Heavenly Journey. City: Fons Vitae, 2006.
 Hadith On Isra and Mi'raj from Sahih Muslim
 Isra Wal Miraj The Full Story Of The Night Journey

Angelic apparitions
Entering heaven alive
Gabriel
Islamic mythology
Islamic terminology
Kandil
Life of Muhammad
Miracles attributed to Muhammad
Quran
Quranic verses
Shia days of remembrance
Sunni Islam
Katabasis